George Wilhelm (April 2, 1829 - August 20, 1920) was an American recipient of the Medal of Honor who fought in the American Civil War.

Biography 
George Wilhelm was born in Scioto Count, Ohio on April 2, 1829. During the war he fought as a captain in the Union Army in Company F of the 56th Ohio Infantry. Wilhelm was presented his Medal of Honor on November 17, 1887 for actions at Champion Hill, or Bakers Creek, Mississippi on May 16, 1863. After his death in Dayton, Ohio he was buried in Greenville Cemetery, Greenville, Mississippi.

Medal of Honor Citation 
For extraordinary heroism on 16 May 1863, while serving with, in action at Champion Hill (Baker's Creek), Mississippi. Having been badly wounded in the breast and captured, Captain Wilhelm made a prisoner of his captor and brought him into camp.

References 

1829 births
1920 deaths
American Civil War recipients of the Medal of Honor
United States Army Medal of Honor recipients